The heats for the men's 50 metre backstroke race at the 2009 World Championships took place in the morning and evening of 1 August, with the final in the evening session of 2 August at the Foro Italico in Rome, Italy.

Records
Prior to this competition, the existing world and competition records were as follows:

The following records were established during the competition:

Results

Heats

Semifinals

Final

External links 
Heats Results
Semifinals Results
Final Results

Backstroke Men 50